Limpopo Pride is a South African professional basketball team located in Limpopo, South Africa. The team competes in the Basketball National League.

Notable players
To appear in this section a player must have either:
- Set a club record or won an individual award as a professional player.
- Played at least one official international match for his senior national team or one NBA game at any time.
 Shane Marhanele
 Thuso Moiloa

References

External links
Presentation at Afrobasket.com

Basketball teams in South Africa
Basketball teams in Limpopo
Basketball teams established in 1993